Neuthal railway station is a railway station in the municipality of Bäretswil, in the Swiss canton of Zürich. It is located on the standard gauge Uerikon–Bauma line of the Sursee-Triengen-Bahn. The station building itself is now the home of the Wildi Bistro-schuppe restaurant.

Services 
 the following services stop at Neuthal:

 Dampfbahn-Verein Zürcher Oberland:
 from the second week of September through the third week in October: three round-trips Monday through Thursday and six round-trips Friday through Sunday between Bauma and Hinwil.

References

External links 
 
 Dampfbahn-Verein Zürcher Oberland 
 Wildi Bistro-schuppe 

Railway stations in the canton of Zürich